Kurt Bürger (27 August 1894 in Karlsruhe, Baden as Karl Wilhelm Ganz – 28 July 1951 in Schwerin) was a German politician.

From 1912 to 1918, he was a representative of the Social Democratic Party. In 1919, he was a cofounder of the Communist Party of Germany.

After World War II, he became a member of the East German Socialist Unity Party and served as minister-president of the East German state of Mecklenburg in 1951.

See also
List of Social Democratic Party of Germany politicians

References

1894 births
1951 deaths
Politicians from Karlsruhe
People from the Grand Duchy of Baden
Social Democratic Party of Germany politicians
Communist Party of Germany politicians
Members of the Central Committee of the Socialist Unity Party of Germany
Members of the Provisional Volkskammer
Members of the 1st Volkskammer
Ministers-President of Mecklenburg-Western Pomerania
Members of the Landtag of Mecklenburg-Western Pomerania
German people of the Spanish Civil War
International Brigades personnel